Thekkattur  is a village in the Arimalamrevenue block of Pudukkottai district, Tamil Nadu, India.

Demographics 

As per the 2011 census, Thekkattur had a total population of 1043  with 531 males and 512 females. Out of the total population 5,280 people were literate.

References

Villages in Pudukkottai district